Elena Utrobina (born 1 January 1985) is a Russian former professional racing cyclist.

Major results

2012
 7th Grand Prix of Maykop
2014
 3rd Grand Prix of Maykop
2015
 1st Stage 2 Tour of Adygeya
 9th Grand Prix of Maykop

See also
 List of 2016 UCI Women's Teams and riders

References

External links
 
 

1985 births
Living people
Russian female cyclists
Place of birth missing (living people)